Leptochiton may refer to:
Leptochiton (chiton), a prehistoric genus of chitons in the family Leptochitonidae
Leptochiton (plant), a genus of plants in the family Amaryllidaceae